Callerton Parkway is a Tyne and Wear Metro station, serving the hamlet of Black Callerton and suburb of Woolsington, Newcastle upon Tyne in Tyne and Wear, England. It joined the network on 17 November 1991, following the opening of the extension from Bank Foot to Newcastle Airport.

History
The majority of the route was already in place, with the alignment having been formerly served by the Ponteland Railway. The Airport branch only required the construction of a short distance (around 0.2 miles) of new right-of-way.

Callerton Parkway is situated close to the site of the former Callerton station, which was located to the north west of the level crossing on Callerton Lane. The station opened to passengers in June 1905, consisting of a single platform, simple pitched roof station building, and a signal box. The line closed to passengers in June 1929, with goods services operating until November 1965.

Refurbishment
In 2018, the station, along with others on the branch between South Gosforth and Newcastle Airport, were refurbished. The £300,000 project saw improvements to accessibility, security and energy efficiency, as well as the rebranding of the station to the new black and white corporate colour scheme.

Facilities 
The station has two platforms, both of which have ticket machines (which accept cash, card and contactless payment), smartcard validators, sheltered waiting area, seating, next train audio and visual displays, timetable and information posters and an emergency help point. There is step-free access to both platforms. The station serves as a park and ride, with 189 spaces (plus seven accessible spaces). There is also cycle storage at the station, with four cycle lockers and five cycle pods.

Services 
, the station is served by up to five trains per hour on weekdays and Saturday, and up to four trains per hour during the evening and on Sunday between South Hylton and Newcastle Airport.

Rolling stock used: Class 599 Metrocar

Accidents and incidents
 In 2008, traffic enforcement cameras were installed at the station's level crossing – this having been the location of over half of the road traffic incidents at the five Metro-owned level crossings on the network. Similar cameras were installed at nearby Bank Foot and Kingston Park in October 2012.

Notes

References

External links
 
 Timetable and station information for Callerton Parkway

Newcastle upon Tyne
1991 establishments in England
Railway stations in Great Britain opened in 1991
Tyne and Wear Metro Green line stations
Transport in Newcastle upon Tyne
Transport in Tyne and Wear
